Harry Edward Tapping (27 March 1926 – 9 February 2008) was a New Zealand cricketer. He played eight first-class matches for Auckland between 1950 and 1953.

See also
 List of Auckland representative cricketers

References

External links
 

1926 births
2008 deaths
New Zealand cricketers
Auckland cricketers
Cricketers from Gisborne, New Zealand